Biermannia is a genus of flowering plants from the orchid family, Orchidaceae. It is native to eastern India, China and Southeast Asia.

Species
The following species are accepted as of May 2014:

Biermannia arunachalensis A.N.Rao  - Arunachal Pradesh
Biermannia bigibba (Schltr.) Garay - Sumatra
Biermannia bimaculata (King & Pantl.) King & Pantl. - Bhutan, Assam
Biermannia calcarata Aver. - Guangxi, Vietnam
Biermannia ciliata (Ridl.) Garay - Thailand, Malaysia
Biermannia flava (Carr) Garay - Pahang
Biermannia jainiana S.N.Hegde & A.N.Rao - Arunachal Pradesh
Biermannia laciniata (Carr) Garay - Malaysia
 Biermannia longicheila 
Biermannia quinquecallosa King & Pantl. - Assam
Biermannia sarcanthoides (Ridl.) Garay - Johor
Biermannia sigaldii Seidenf. - Vietnam

See also 
 List of Orchidaceae genera

References 

 Pridgeon, A.M., Cribb, P.J., Chase, M.A. & Rasmussen, F. eds. (1999). Genera Orchidacearum 1. Oxford Univ. Press.
 Pridgeon, A.M., Cribb, P.J., Chase, M.A. & Rasmussen, F. eds. (2001). Genera Orchidacearum 2. Oxford Univ. Press.
 Pridgeon, A.M., Cribb, P.J., Chase, M.A. & Rasmussen, F. eds. (2003). Genera Orchidacearum 3. Oxford Univ. Press
 Berg Pana, H. 2005. Handbuch der Orchideen-Namen. Dictionary of Orchid Names. Dizionario dei nomi delle orchidee. Ulmer, Stuttgart

External links 

Orchids of India
Orchids of China
Orchids of Malaysia
Orchids of Thailand
Orchids of Vietnam
Orchids of Assam
Vandeae genera
Aeridinae